An Annual Comprehensive Financial Report, formerly called Comprehensive Annual Financial Report (CAFR)) is a set of U.S. government financial statements comprising the financial report of a state, municipal or other governmental entity that complies with the accounting requirements promulgated by the Governmental Accounting Standards Board (GASB).  GASB provides standards for the content of a Comprehensive Annual Financial Report in its annually updated publication Codification of Governmental Accounting and Financial Reporting Standards. The U.S. Federal Government adheres to standards determined by the Federal Accounting Standards Advisory Board (FASAB).

A Comprehensive Annual Financial Report is compiled by a state, municipal or other governmental accounting staff and audited by an external American Institute of Certified Public Accountants (AICPA) certified accounting firm utilizing GASB requirements. It is composed of three sections: Introductory, Financial and Statistical. It combines the financial information of fund accounting and Enterprise Authorities accounting.

In 2021, the Government Finance Officers Association determined that, when spoken, the four letter acronym for "Comprehensive Annual Financial Report" sounded like an offensive slur used in South Africa (see Kaffir) and decided to deprecate the term.

Further reading
 Jonathan Walters, Are Comprehensive Annual Financial Reports Useless?, Governing (September 2012).

References

Accounting in the United States
Government audit
Government finances in the United States
Single Audit
United States Generally Accepted Accounting Principles